"Då står pojkarna på rad" is a song by Swedish singer-songwriter Orup from his second studio album, Orup 2 (1989).

Track listing and formats 

 Swedish 7-inch single

A. "Då står pojkarna på rad" – 4:19
B. "Kyss mig som du brukade göra" – 3:49

Credits and personnel 

 Orup – songwriter, vocals
 Anders Glenmark – producer
 Lennart Östlund – engineering
 Sofia Wistam – cover art, photographer
 Beatrice Uusma – cover art designer

Credits and personnel adopted from the Orup 2 album and 7-inch single liner notes.

Charts

References 

1989 songs
1989 singles
Orup songs
Song recordings produced by Anders Glenmark
Songs written by Orup
Swedish-language songs
Warner Music Group singles